Barefoot Ki-bong is a 2006 South Korean film.

Production
The film based its story on the real person Um Ki Bong,a disabled person who gained attention through a documentary that locally aired in the country for his fillial piety and running capabilities.The film was filmed in Namhae.

Plot 
Ki-bong is a mentally challenged forty-year-old man who lives in a rural village with his aging mother. After accidentally winning a local race, Ki-bong finds himself training for the National Amateur Half Marathon so that he can buy his mother some false teeth with the prize money. Despite being coached by the head of the village, Mr. Baek, the villagers remain skeptical about his chances of winning, all except for the girl who works in the local photo shop.

Cast 
 Shin Hyun-joon as Ki-bong
 Kim Soo-mi as Mrs. Om, Ki-bong's mother
 Im Ha-ryong as Mr. Baek
 Tak Jae-hoon
 Kim Hyo-jin
 Ji Dae-han
 Jo Deok-hyeon
 Yoo Min-seok
 Do Ji-won

Release 
Barefoot Ki-bong was released in South Korea on 26 April 2006, and on its opening weekend was ranked second at the box office with 362,023 admissions. It went on to receive a total of 2,347,311 admissions nationwide, making it the ninth biggest selling Korean film of 2006, and grossing (as of 28 May 2006) $11,968,478.

References

External links 
  
 
 
 

2006 films
2000s Korean-language films
South Korean sports films
South Korean comedy-drama films
Athletics films
Films about disability
Showbox films
South Korean films based on actual events
2000s South Korean films